The Pretoria-Pietersburg Railway 26 Tonner 0-6-0ST of 1896 was a South African steam locomotive from the pre-Union era in Transvaal.

In 1896 and 1897, the Pretoria-Pietersburg Railway in the Zuid-Afrikaansche Republiek placed three   locomotives in service. These locomotives were not classified and, since all three were named, they were referred to by name.<ref name="SAR&H Dec 1944">Espitalier, T.J.; Day, W.A.J. (1944). The Locomotive in South Africa - A Brief History of Railway Development. Chapter V - Other Transvaal and O.F.S. Railways. South African Railways and Harbours Magazine, December 1944. pp. 925-928.</ref>

The Pretoria-Pietersburg Railway
The Pretoria-Pietersburg Railway Company (PPR), incorporated in London on 13 May 1896 with a capital of £500,000, constructed a railway which operated northward from Pretoria West via Warmbad and Nylstroom to Pietersburg. The  line was constructed under a concession granted by the government of the Zuid-Afrikaansche Republiek (ZAR) to Hendrik Jacobus Schoeman on 30 October 1895. Construction commenced in 1897 and the first  to Nylstroom was opened to traffic on 1 July 1898. The remaining  to Pietersburg was completed on 31 May 1899.

On 1 May 1899, the southern terminus of the PPR at Pretoria West was connected to Pretoria station of the NZASM by a link line, constructed at the cost of the PPR. Mr. G. Mayo was appointed as the General Manager of the PPR, and the official opening of the whole line took place on 21 May 1899.

Manufacturer
The first locomotives of the PPR were three   engines which were built by Hawthorn, Leslie and Company, one in 1896 and the other two in 1897. They were employed as construction locomotives while the line was being built and were not classified or numbered, but named Pretoria, Pietersburg and Nylstroom.

Characteristics
The steam chests were arranged between the frames, with the slide valves being actuated by Stephenson valve gear through rocker shafts.

Service

NZASM

As a result of the outbreak of the Second Boer War in 1899 and since the PPR was owned by a British registered company, the railway and its rolling stock were seized by the ZAR government in October 1899, only five months after the railway was completed to Pietersburg. The railway was then worked briefly by the Neder­landsche-Zuid-Afrikaansche Spoor­weg-Maatschappij (NZASM), until that railway was itself seized by the invading British military forces towards the end of the same year.The South African Railways - Historical Survey. Editor George Hart, Publisher Bill Hart, Sponsored by Dorbyl Ltd., Published c. 1978, pp. 20, 22-23, 25.

Imperial Military Railways
All railway operations in the two Boer Republics, the ZAR and the Orange Free State, were taken over by the Imperial Military Railways (IMR) in 1899 and operated by the invading military for the duration of the war.

Central South African Railways
At least two of the three locomotives survived the war. At the end of the war, the IMR was transformed into the Central South African Railways (CSAR).

South African Railways
When the Union of South Africa was established on 31 May 1910, the three Colonial government railways (CGR, Natal Government Railways and CSAR) were united under a single administration to control and administer the railways, ports and harbours of the Union. Although the South African Railways and Harbours came into existence in 1910, the actual classification and renumbering of all the rolling stock of the three constituent railways were only implemented with effect from 1 January 1912.

Two of the locomotives, the engines Nylstroom and Pietersburg, survived in railway service to be taken onto the South African Railways (SAR) roster in 1912. Since they were considered obsolete, they were excluded from the SAR classification and renumbering list. In spite of being obsolete, both of them survived in SAR service into the 1940s, employed as shunting engines at the Salvokop workshops in Pretoria and to test the steam heating system of passenger trains.Classification of S.A.R. Engines with Renumbering Lists, issued by the Chief Mechanical Engineer's Office, Pretoria, January 1912, p. 2 (Reprinted in April 1987 by SATS Museum, R.3125-6/9/11-1000)Soul of A Railway, System 8, Part 1: Pretoria: including local services, workshops and running sheds, Part 1. Caption 31. (Accessed on 15 March 2017)

Upon their eventual retirement, the engines Nylstroom and Pietersburg were plinthed outside the Nylstroom and Pietersburg stations respectively.

Works numbers
The 26 Tonner names, works numbers and years built are as follows:
 The engine Pretoria - 2346 of 1896.
 The engine Pietersburg - 2369 of 1897.
 The engine Nylstroom'' - 2370 of 1897.

Illustration
All three 26 Tonner locomotives are illustrated in the following photographs.

References

0850
0-6-0ST locomotives
C locomotives
Hawthorn Leslie and Company locomotives
Cape gauge railway locomotives
Railway locomotives introduced in 1896
1896 in South Africa